Xavier Rhodes (born June 19, 1990) is an American football cornerback who is a free agent. He played college football at Florida State, and was drafted by the Minnesota Vikings in the first round (25th overall) of the 2013 NFL Draft. With the Vikings, Rhodes made three Pro Bowls and was a first-team All-Pro selection.

Early years
Rhodes attended Miami Norland High School in Miami Gardens, Florida, where he was a two-sport star in football and track. He played as a wide receiver, running back, and defensive back for the Miami Norland Vikings football team. As a junior, he recorded more than 1,000 all-purpose yards. In his senior year, he led his school in both rushing and receiving, and earning a spot on the Miami Herald All-Dade team on both the offensive and defensive side of the ball. He played in the 12th annual Nike South Florida All-Star game. He was honored as 6A FSWA first-team All-state selection, and a first-team All-Dade County athlete.

Rhodes also excelled in track & field at Norland. In his first season of track in 2007, he posted a personal-best time of 48.60 seconds in the 400-meter dash. At the 2008 Sam Burley Hall of Fame Meet, he earned a third-place finish in the 200-meter dash event with a time of 22.25 seconds. As a senior, he qualified for the state finals in the 100-meter dash after running a career-best time of 10.70 seconds in the prelims of the regional championship.

Regarded as a three-star recruit by Rivals.com, Rhodes was listed as the No. 75 wide receiver and the No. 91 prospect in the state of Florida. He chose FSU over scholarship offers from West Virginia, Auburn, and Florida International.

College career
Rhodes received an athletic scholarship to attend Florida State University, where he played for coach Jimbo Fisher's Florida State Seminoles football team from 2009 to 2012. He started 38 of 43 games in the secondary in his distinguished college career.

Freshman (redshirt)

As a freshman in 2009, Rhodes played in only two games against Boston College and Georgia Tech on special teams before suffering a hand injury that sidelined him for the rest of the season. He was granted a medical redshirt, preserving him another year of college eligibility.

Freshman

In 2010, Rhodes started all 14 games at the boundary cornerback position and emerged as a promising young star for FSU's vastly improved defense. He used his physical attributes to record 12 pass breakups and four interceptions, good for a share of the team lead. His pass breakups and 16 passes defended led all freshmen nationally. He was credited with three pass breakups in pivotal Atlantic Division wins over Boston College and Clemson. He also intercepted a pass in the end zone against the Tigers which proved to swing the momentum in the Seminoles' 16-13 victory. His previous interceptions came against BYU and NC State. A sure tackler, the Miami native ranked seventh on the team with 58 stops and his 49 solo tackles ranked fourth. Rhodes's ability to play close to the line of scrimmage in coverage enabled him to collect 3.5 tackles for loss on the season and two sacks. He recovered the first two fumbles of his career in FSU's home finale against Florida in a 31-7 rout. He was named one of the top newcomers on defense at the annual Florida State football banquet. In all, he recorded 54 tackles, four interceptions, and two sacks. He was named the ACC Defensive Rookie of the Year and was a consensus freshman All-American. He also earned National Defensive Freshman of the Year honors from Collegefootballnews.com.

Sophomore

In his redshirt sophomore season in 2011, Rhodes started as part of a three-man cornerback rotation with Mike Harris and Greg Reid. He made five tackles at Clemson, at Wake Forest, and Duke. Against Maryland, Rhodes tallied a season-high six tackles. He intercepted his first pass of the season against NC State. He finished with four tackles in the win over Notre Dame in the 2011 Champs Sports Bowl. He registered 43 stops (36 solo) on the season with 1.5 tackles for loss, one interception, and four pass-breakups for the season. He was selected as the Mr. Dependable Skill Award winner at the team's annual banquet.

Junior

For his junior season in 2012, Rhodes was named to preseason watchlists for the Bednarik Award and Nagurski Trophy. He was also the only player from the ACC to be named a semifinalist for the Thorpe Award. He defended 10 passes on the season, placing 11th in the ACC and leading all FSU players, while his three interceptions tied for 8th and also tied for the team lead, leading this to earn first-team All-ACC honors. He also added seven pass break-ups which tied for third on the team. He recorded 39 tackles (27 unassisted) and 2.0 tackles for loss. His third interception and eighth career pick came in the ACC Championship Game versus Georgia Tech. The two other picks came against Murray State and at USF. He forced and recovered a fumble in the Orange Bowl against Northern Illinois. He registered a season-high seven tackles at NC State. He anchored an FSU secondary that held nine of the top 10 receivers in the ACC at the time they faced them to a combined 22 catches for 244 yards. In the last 12 games, he was targeted 47 times and allowed just 13 completions for 88 yards with two interceptions and seven pass break-ups. He helped Florida State's defense lead the nation in yards allowed per play (3.86), rank second nationally in total defense (254.14 ypg) and rank in the top six nationally in scoring defense (14.71 ppg), rushing defense (92.29 ypg), pass defense (161.86 ypg), pass efficiency defense (95.43) and opponent three-and-outs (6.29 per game). He earned the Mr. Dependable Skill Award at the team's annual banquet for the second straight year.

Shortly after FSU's 31–10 victory over Northern Illinois in the 2013 Orange Bowl, Rhodes announced his decision to forgo his final year of collegiate eligibility, entering the 2013 NFL Draft. "I did all I could in college. If I was to come back, I don't think my status would be getting any better," said Rhodes.

College statistics

Professional career
Coming out of Florida State, Rhodes was projected as a first-round selection in the 2013 NFL Draft by Sports Illustrated.

Minnesota Vikings

2013
The Minnesota Vikings selected Rhodes in the first round (25th overall) of the 2013 NFL Draft. The pick used to select him was acquired from the Seattle Seahawks in a trade for Percy Harvin. He was the fourth cornerback selected in 2013 and was the highest selected defensive back from Florida State since Antonio Cromartie was taken 19th overall by the San Diego Chargers in the 2006 NFL Draft.

On July 13, 2013, the Minnesota Vikings signed Rhodes to a four-year, $7.80 million contract that includes $6.33 million guaranteed and a signing bonus of $4.05 million.

Rhodes began training camp slated as a starting cornerback, but saw competition for the role from Josh Robinson. Head coach Leslie Frazier named Rhodes the third cornerback on the depth chart, behind veterans Chris Cook and Josh Robinson. He was also selected to be the starting nickelback in nickel and dime packages.

He made his professional regular season debut and first career start in the Minnesota Vikings' season-opener at the Detroit Lions and recorded three solo tackles in their 34–24 loss. Rhodes made his first career tackle on wide receiver Calvin Johnson after a seven-yard reception in the second quarter. On October 27, 2013, Rhodes recorded a season-high seven solo tackles during a 44–31 loss to the Green Bay Packers. In Week 12, Rhodes earned his first start as an outside cornerback after Josh Robinson sustained a fractured sternum the previous week and was expected to be sidelined for a  month. Rhodes recorded a season-high four pass deflections and made four solo tackles during a 26–26 tie at the Green Bay Packers. On December 8, 2013, Rhodes made three solo tackles and three pass deflections before exiting the Vikings' 29–26 loss at the Baltimore Ravens after sustaining an ankle injury. He was sidelined for the last three games of the season (Weeks 15–17). On December 30, 2013, it was announced that the Minnesota Vikings fired head coach Leslie Frazier after finishing fourth in the NFC North with a 5–10–1 record. He finished his rookie season in 2013 with 48 combined tackles (41 solo) and ten pass deflections in 13 games and six starts.

2014
Rhodes entered training camp slated as one of the starting outside cornerbacks. Head coach Mike Zimmer officially named Rhodes the starter to begin the regular season, along with Captain Munnerlyn.

In Week 4, he tied a career-high with four pass deflections and made five combined tackles in the Vikings' 41–28 victory over the Atlanta Falcons. On November 16, 2014, Rhodes collected four combined tackles, broke up a pass, and made his first career interception off a pass by Jay Cutler during a 21–13 loss at the Chicago Bears in Week 11. In Week 16, Rhodes collected a season-high five solo tackles in the Vikings' 37–35 loss at the Miami Dolphins. He finished the season with 49 combined tackles (39 solo), a career-high 18 pass deflections, and an interception in 16 games and 16 starts. His 18 pass deflections led the Vikings' defense and finished fourth among all players in the league. The Minnesota Vikings finished with a 7–9 record, but were able to improve to seventh overall in pass defense after finishing 31st the previous season.

2015
Rhodes was joined by Terence Newman and rookie first round pick Trae Waynes in 2015. Defensive coordinator George Edwards named Rhodes the No. 1 outside cornerback, opposite Terence Newman, to begin the regular season.

He started the Minnesota Vikings' season-opener at the San Francisco 49ers and collected a season-high seven solo tackles in their 20–3 loss. On January 3, 2016, Rhodes made three solo tackles, a pass deflection, and intercepted a pass by Aaron Rodgers during a 20–13 victory at the Green Bay Packers. He finished the  season with a career-high 58 combined tackles (55 solo), ten pass deflections, and an interception in 16 games and 16 starts.

The Minnesota Vikings finished their second season under head coach Mike Zimmer with an 11–5 record and first in the NFC North. On January 10, 2016, Rhodes started in his first career playoff game and recorded four solo tackles and two pass deflections during a 10–9 loss to the Seattle Seahawks in the NFC Wildcard Game.

2016
On May 2, 2016, the Vikings exercised the fifth-year, $8.02 million option on Rhodes' rookie contract. Head coach Mike Zimmer retained Xavier Rhodes and Terence Newman as the starting cornerbacks to begin the regular season.

While preparing to play in the season-opener against the Tennessee Titans, Rhodes sustained a knee injury while stretching on the field. His injury sidelined him for the first two games (Weeks 1–2) of the season. On October 3, 2016, Rhodes recorded two combined tackles, broke up two passes, and intercepted quarterback Eli Manning during a 24–10 victory against the New York Giants on Monday Night Football. He was a key part of the secondary that held Odell Beckham Jr. to only five receptions for 23-yards. In Week 11, Rhodes recorded three combined tackles, two pass deflections, and intercepted two passes by quarterback Carson Palmer in the Vikings' 30–24 victory against the Arizona Cardinals. In the second quarter, he intercepted a pass intended for John Brown and returned it for a 100-yard touchdown  On the game, Rhodes allowed a passer rating of 0.0 into his coverage, surrendering as many catches (two, for 16 yards) on seven targets as interceptions and earning the highest-graded game of any player in Week 11 according to Pro Football Focus (PFF) at +94.5. Rhodes performance earned him NFC Defensive Player of the Week. On December 20, 2016, Rhodes was voted to the 2017 Pro Bowl, marking the first of his career. In Week 16, Rhodes collected a season-high seven combined tackles during a 38–25 loss at the Green Bay Packers. He finished the season with 52 combined tackles (44 solo), 11 pass deflections, five interceptions, and a touchdown in 14 games and 14 starts. Pro Football Focus ranked him 29th in overall grades among the 111 qualifying cornerbacks in 2016.

The Minnesota Vikings were unable to qualify for the playoffs after finishing third in their division with an 8–8 record. Rhodes was ranked the 66th best player in the NFL on the NFL Top 100 Players of 2017.

2017
On July 30, 2017, the Minnesota Vikings signed Rhodes to a five-year, $70.10 million extension that includes $32.80 million guaranteed and a $12 million signing bonus.

Head coach Mike Zimmer named Rhodes and Trae Waynes the starting cornerbacks to start the regular season. On November 23, 2017, Rhodes recorded a season-high five solo tackles, two pass deflections, and intercepted a pass by Matthew Stafford during a 30–23 victory at the Detroit Lions. The following week, he tied his season-high of five solo tackles in the Vikings' 14–9 victory at the Atlanta Falcons in Week 13. On December 19, 2017, it was announced that Rhodes was voted to the 2018 Pro Bowl. He finished the  season with 56 combined tackles (44 solo), ten pass deflections, and two interceptions in 16 games and 16 starts. Pro Football Focus gave Rhodes an overall grade of 80.2, ranking him 44th among all qualified cornerbacks in 2017.

The Minnesota Vikings finished atop their division with a 13–3 record and received a first round bye. On January 14, 2018, Rhodes recorded two solo tackles and two pass deflections during the Vikings' 29–24 win against the New Orleans Saints in the NFC Divisional Round. The Vikings were eliminated from the playoffs the following week after losing 38–7 at the Philadelphia Eagles in the NFC Championship Game. He was ranked 55th on the NFL Top 100 Players of 2018.

Rhodes was released by the Vikings on March 13, 2020 after seven seasons.

Indianapolis Colts
On March 30, 2020, Rhodes signed a one-year contract with the Indianapolis Colts.

In Week 3 against the New York Jets, Rhodes recorded his first two interceptions (including a 44 yard pick six) as a member of the Colts off of passes thrown by Sam Darnold during the 36–7 win.
He was named the AFC Defensive Player of the Week for his performance in Week 3.

Rhodes re-signed with the Colts on March 24, 2021. He started 13 games in 2021, recording 39 tackles, seven passes defensed and one interception.

Buffalo Bills
Rhodes signed with the practice squad of the Buffalo Bills on September 28, 2022. He was promoted to the active roster on November 26, 2022. He was released on January 4, 2023.

Dallas Cowboys
On January 7, 2023, the Dallas Cowboys signed Rhodes to their practice squad. Rhodes was promoted to the active roster on January 16th and made his Cowboys debut against the Tampa Bay Buccaneers in the NFC Wild Card Round.   His practice squad contract with the team expired after the season on January 22, 2023.

Minnesota Vikings franchise records
 Most passes defended by a rookie: 10 (2013)
 Longest interception return: 100 yards (2016)

NFL career statistics

Regular season

References

External links
 Florida State Seminoles bio

1990 births
Living people
American football cornerbacks
Buffalo Bills players
Dallas Cowboys players
Florida State Seminoles football players
Indianapolis Colts players
Minnesota Vikings players
National Conference Pro Bowl players
Players of American football from Miami
Miami Norland Senior High School alumni